How to Operate with a Blown Mind is the debut studio album by Lo Fidelity Allstars, originally released on Skint Records in 1998.

In a rundown of "intelligent big beat", Simon Reynolds called the album an "oxymoronic masterpiece of 'darkside big beat'." NME named it the 21st best album of 1998.

Track listing

Personnel 
Credits adapted from liner notes.

 The Wrekked Train – vocals
 The Albino Priest – turntables, sampler
 A One Man Crowd Called Gentile – bass guitar
 The Slammer – drums
 Sheriff John Stone – keyboards
 The Many Tentacles – keyboards, engineering
 Sean "The Bison" Phillips – guitar (on "I Used to Fall in Love")
 Lisa Millett – vocals (on "Vision Incision")
 Ben Mitchell – keyboards (on "Vision Incision")

Charts

References

External links 
 
 

1998 debut albums
Lo Fidelity Allstars albums
Skint Records albums